Soyuz TMA-09M was a Russian Soyuz mission to the International Space Station. It transported three members of the Expedition 36 crew to the space station. The Soyuz remained docked to the space station during Expeditions 36 and 37 to serve as an emergency escape vehicle. The spacecraft landed on 11 November 2013, carrying the same three cosmonauts who were aboard for launch.
The crew of Soyuz TMA-09M consisted of Fyodor Yurchikhin of Roskosmos, Karen Nyberg of NASA and Luca Parmitano of the European Space Agency.

Crew

Backup crew

Launch and docking
Soyuz TMA-09M was launched from Site 1/5 at the Baikonur Cosmodrome in Kazakhstan. Launch took place at 20:31:00 UTC on 28 May 2013, with a Soyuz-FG carrier rocket propelling the spacecraft into low Earth orbit. The spacecraft separated from the upper stage of the carrier rocket nine minutes after liftoff.

Docking with the ISS, using the nadir port of the Rassvet module, occurred at 02:10 UTC on 29 May, less than six hours after launch as part of a fast rendezvous profile designed to minimise the time the crew must spend in the cramped Soyuz spacecraft.

References

Crewed Soyuz missions
Spacecraft launched in 2013
Spacecraft which reentered in 2013
2013 in Russia
Spacecraft launched by Soyuz-FG rockets